High School Affiliated to Shanghai Jiao Tong University (JDFZ; HSASJTU) is a major boarding school in Shanghai.

The school is located on the border of Yangpu, Hongkou and Baoshan Districts of Shanghai, People's Republic of China. Founded in 1954, it is one of the "Top 4" high schools in Shanghai with a very competitive admission rate. Each year it enrolls 400 students in China and has an international division that offers Advanced Placement (AP), International Baccalaureate (IB) and Cambridge IGCSE courses. It is under the jurisdiction of Shanghai Municipal Education Commission and Shanghai Jiao Tong University.

School History 
The school was founded in 1954, as "Shanghai First Express High School of Workers and Peasants". 

In 1958, it became the preparatory school of Shanghai Jiao Tong University. 

In 1962, it became the preparatory school (affiliated high school) of Shanghai Institute of Technology. It was renamed "Jiaotong High School"

In 1963, and in 1964, it adopted the current name, "High School Affiliated to Shanghai Jiao Tong University" with the acception by Shanghai Jiaotong University.

October 5, 1968, Shanghai revolutionary committee issued a document, Jiao Tong University Affiliated Middle School under the leadership of the revolutionary committee of Yangpu district.

On April 3, 1985, Shanghai Municipal Education and Health issued a document that the High School Affiliated to Shanghai Jiaotong University was the dual leader of Shanghai Jiaotong University and Municipal Education Bureau.

In February 2005, the school was officially named the first batch of "Shanghai Experimental Demonstration High Schools".

Achievement 
The school took the lead in carrying out the practical exploration of senior high school career education, and the relevant achievements won the second prize of the first National Teaching Achievement Award in 2014. Hundreds of well-known domestic high schools came to the school to "learn from". Based on the construction of curriculum center, the school creates a variety of school-based courses to meet the personalized development of students. At present, the training mode of Zhiyuan Talent Center has been gradually improved and formed. The STEM Curriculum Center offers 15 excellent courses, the Advanced Placement Program Center offers 9 courses, and the Extracurricular Academic Activity Center has designed short-term practical courses of service for 200 students. Every year, the High School Affiliated to Jiaotong University recruits potential students from dozens of junior high schools, providing more opportunities for outstanding graduates. Every year, about 70% of the graduates are admitted to Tsinghua University, Peking University, Fudan University, Shanghai Jiao Tong University and other Chinese top universities, and the admission rate of top universities is nearly 90%.

International Education 
The High School Affiliated to Jiaotong University actively explores the new pattern of international education. In 2006, the International Department was set up, recruiting foreign students from more than 20 countries such as the United States, Germany, France, Japan and so on. In 2011, the International Curriculum Center was established to offer internationally recognized IB international courses with the highest value. In 2014, the Joint Examination Course of Hong Kong, Macau and Taiwan was opened to recruit students from Hong Kong, Macau and Taiwan.

Admission 
The enrollment of the school is around 400 each year. Most are from municipal area of Shanghai. Some outstanding candidates can be admitted by recommendation, rather than entrance exams. The school also recruits a few students with talent in Basketball and Track and Field.

List of principals 
 Qian Junhong (钱君洪) (1954.7 - 1962.3)
 Shi Handing (石汉鼎) (1962.3 - 1971.4; 1978. 2. - 1981.3)
 Hu Yipei (胡益培) (1981.3 - 1991.2)
 Xu Zhenguo (许镇国) (1991.2 - 1995.2)
 Shao Shixin (邵士信) (1995.2 - 2002.8)
 Xu Xiangdong (徐向东) (2002.8 - )

References

External links 
  School Website
  Zhihu Website

Schools in Shanghai
High schools in Shanghai
International Baccalaureate schools in China